Årdalstangen is the administrative centre of Årdal Municipality in Vestland county, Norway. The village is one of the two main population centers in the municipality, along with the village of Øvre Årdal.

One road and two pedestrian bridges cross Hæreidselvi river which runs through the village, flowing from lake Årdalsvatnet into the Årdalsfjord.

Årdalstangen serves as an important transportation hub for the aluminium industry. Norsk Hydro's site for production of coal for anodes and small port at the end of the Årdalsfjord are located here.  The village also has a hotel and other tourist accommodations.  Årdal Church is located in the village.

References

External links
 Årdal Sogelag 
 Årdalsportalen 

Villages in Vestland
Årdal